This is a list of municipalities in Chile which have standing links to local communities in other countries. In most cases, the association, especially when formalised by local government, is known as "town twinning" (usually in Europe) or "sister cities" (usually in the rest of the world).

A
Los Andes
 Saltillo, Mexico

Antofagasta

 Split, Croatia
 Tongling, China
 Volos, Greece

Arica

 Arequipa, Peru
 Eilat, Israel
 Montevideo, Uruguay

B
Lo Barnechea
 Tyler, United States

C
Calama
 Arad, Israel

La Calera
 Beit Jala, Palestine

Chanco
 Zapotlanejo, Mexico

Casablanca
 Napa, United States

Chillán

 Mürzzuschlag, Austria
 Río Cuarto, Argentina

Chimbarongo
 Tequila, Mexico

La Cisterna
 Bethlehem, Palestine

Concepción

 Bethlehem, Palestine
 Campinas, Brazil
 Medellín, Colombia
 Monterrey, Mexico
 Nanjing, China
 La Plata, Argentina
 San Miguel de Tucumán, Argentina
 Wuhan, China

Conchalí
 Leganés, Spain

Las Condes

 Bethlehem, Palestine
 Miraflores, Peru
 Petah Tikva, Israel

Coquimbo

 Elbląg, Poland
 San Juan, Argentina

E
Easter Island

 Maui County, United States
 Torsby, Sweden

Estación Central
 Jericho, Palestine

I
Iquique

 Arequipa, Peru
 Ashkelon, Israel
 Dourados, Brazil
 Nanning, China
 Taizhou, China
 Vitória, Brazil
 Zadar, Croatia

M
Melipilla

 Cubatão, Brazil
 Itajaí, Brazil

O
Osorno

 Bariloche, Argentina
 Blumenau, Brazil

P
Padre Las Casas
 Tequila, Mexico

Pedro Aguirre Cerda
 Laval, Canada

Pudahuel
 Rubí, Spain

Puerto Montt

 Bariloche, Argentina
 Qingdao, China

Punta Arenas

 Bellingham, United States
 Harbin, China
 Río Gallegos, Argentina

 Ushuaia, Argentina

Purranque
 Bariloche, Argentina

Puerto Varas

 Abbottabad, Pakistan
 Bariloche, Argentina
 Gramado, Brazil
 Maldonado, Uruguay

Puyehue
 Tecámac, Mexico

R
Rancagua

 Logroño, Spain
 Paju, South Korea
 San Francisco, Argentina

S
San Felipe
 Zapotlán el Grande, Mexico

San Fernando
 Afula, Israel

San Pedro de Atacama

 Magdalena, United States
 Yokneam Illit, Israel

Santa Cruz
 Oaxaca de Juárez, Mexico

Santiago

 Beijing, China
 Buenos Aires, Argentina
 Guangzhou, China
 Kyiv, Ukraine
 London, England, United Kingdom
 Madrid, Spain
 Miami, United States
 Minneapolis, United States
 Riga, Latvia
 São Paulo, Brazil
 Tangier, Morocco

La Serena

 Changzhou, China
 Hawaii County, United States
 Kraków, Poland
 Millbrae, United States
 San Juan, Argentina
 Talavera de la Reina, Spain
 Tenri, Japan
 Tlalnepantla de Baz, Mexico

T
Talcahuano
 Bahía Blanca, Argentina

V
Valparaíso

 Badalona, Spain
 Barcelona, Spain
 Bat Yam, Israel
 Busan, South Korea
 Callao, Peru
 Córdoba, Argentina
 Guangzhou, China
 Havana, Cuba
 Long Beach, United States
 Malacca, Malaysia
 Manzanillo, Mexico
 Medellín, Colombia
 Novorossiysk, Russia
 Oviedo, Spain
 Rosario, Argentina
 Salvador, Brazil
 Santa Fe, Spain
 Shanghai, China
 Veracruz, Mexico

Vicuña
 San Juan, Argentina

Villa Alemana
 Bethlehem, Palestine

Viña del Mar

 Changwon, South Korea
 Miraflores, Peru
 Sausalito, United States
 Wuxi, China

Vitacura
 Beyoğlu, Turkey

References

Chile
Foreign relations of Chile
Populated places in Chile
Chile geography-related lists